São Tomé and Principe Championship  (Portuguese: Campeonato Nacional) is the top division of the São Toméan Football Federation. In the current 2021/22 season there are 18 teams participating in two separate leagues - 12 teams from São Tomé Island, whose league has two relegation places, alongside 6 teams from Príncipe Island, which operates as a single division with no relegation.

The championship is decided in a match between the São Tomé Island champions and the Príncipe Island champions. The champion heads to the qualifying round of the CAF Champions League each season, for some seasons, there were no participants.  Since 1998, the champion competes in the São Tomé and Príncipe Super Cup in the following year. Like Cape Verde further to the northwest in the Atlantic, they are the only two countries in Africa where only the title of each national subdivision spends only a year in the competition and being the few remaining nations to do so.  Unlike Cape Verde, it may be the only remaining nation that the national championship consists just the knockout phase and also just the finals match.

The championships are broadcast each year on the state network TVS and across Africa on RTP África.

History
Before independence on 12 July 1975, there was a colonial competition which took place, with the first season played in 1935.

The inaugural season started in February 1977. From that time to 1985, the São Tomé Regional championships was the only competition and was considered the national competition.  Its first competition featuring a Príncipe club was in 1985 when they had their first championship season.  The São Tomé regionals was again the national champion in 1986, 1991 and from 1994 to 1996.

A few cancellations occurred including 1983, 1987, 1992 1997, 2002, from 2005 to 2006 and in 2008, there was no single season competition in 2010 as the 2009-10 season continued that time.

Title history
Vitória Riboque won the first title after independence in 1977 and won three successive titles, from that time up to 2007, it held the most titles per club.  It was shared with Sporting Praia Cruz in 2007 and shared it for six years until the club became the one who possesses the most championship titles in the nation and being current champions and won ten titles.  Guadalupe was the second club to get a title in 1980, then Sporting Praia Cruz, Andorinha, 6 de Setembro Os Operários, the first club from Príncipe to get at title.  Later Santana became the seventh club to get a title in 1991, Inter Bom-Bom in 1995, Bairros Unidos in 1996.  Sundy became a second Príncipe club to get a title in 2010 and the recent Sporting Príncipe in 2011. The last time a club from Príncipe won a championship title was in 2012.  Its recent club to get a title was UDRA, the twelfth one in 2014.

Sporting Praia Cruz won the most titles numbering 8, followed by Vitória Riboque with 5, Os Operários with four, Inter Bom-Bom with three, Bairros Unidos, Guadalupe, Sporting Príincipe and now UDRA of São João dos Angolares with two and seventh and remaining are with a single title including 6 de Setembro, Andorinha, Santana and Sundy.  9 out of 12 clubs who won a championship title are from the island of São Tomé.

By island, São Tomé has the most champ titles with 23 over Príncipe's 7 titles won by two clubs.  By district, Água Grande of São Tomé is the leader with 15 which is less than half, Pagué of Príncipe has 7 titles (more than 20%), the remaining are of São Tomé, Me-Zochi has five, Lobata and now Caué has each two and Cantagalo has one. Lobata, Cantagalo and Caué's totals were won by only a club each.  6 of the 7 districts has a club (or more) who won a title or more, Lembá is the only district which a club never won any national titles.

Until 1980, all the titles were based in the Água Grande District, in 1980, Lobata became the second district to have titles. Pagué became third to have a title, Cantagalo became fourth and Me-Zochi became fifth. In 1993, Pagué shared Lobata's totals in 1993 being second, in 1996, Me-Zochi shared with the two districts being second in title rankings by district. This changed as Pagué became second in title totals in 1998 which was later shared with Me-Zochi in 2000 and put Lobata's total third, that district superseded Pagué's in second most title titles in 2001 and putting that district third, Lobata fourth and Cantagalo last. Me-Zochi held the second most titles by district in 2001 and lasted until 2010 when it became shared, since 2011, again Pagué has the second most title totals and again put Me-Zochi third. In 2014, Caué became the recent district to have a title. In 2017, Caué is now sharing with Lobata with the fourth most titles by district.

Island or regional championship articles

Clubs 2021/22

Promoted

 Guadalupe
 UD Correia

Relegated

 Folha Fede
 Santana

Note: Promotion and relegation decided from the 2019/20 season, as 2020/21 was not played due to the COVID-19 pandemic.

São Tomé

Príncipe

Previous winners

Before independence

1935-37: Unknown
1938: Andorinha
1939: Sport Lisboa e São Tomé 1-0 Bombeiros
1940-51: Unknown
1952: Sporting Clube de São Tomé
1953: Sindicato
1954-58: Unknown
1959: No competition
1960-62: Unknown
1963: Porto de São Tomé
1964: Porto de São Tomé
1965: Andorinha
1966 - Sporting Clube de São Tomé
1967: Andorinha
1968: Andorinha
1969: Andorinha
1970: Andorinha
1971: Sporting Clube de São Tomé
1972: Not known
1973: Andorinha
1974: Not known

Performance by club

Since independence
1977 : Vitória FC (Riboque)
1978 : Vitória FC (Riboque)
1979 : Vitória FC (Riboque)
1980 : CD Guadalupe
1981 : CD Guadalupe
1982 : Sporting Praia Cruz
1983 : no championship
1984 : Andorinha SC (Ponta Mina)
1985 : Sporting Praia Cruz
1986 : Vitória FC (Riboque)
1987 : no championship
1988 : 6 de Setembro (Praia)
1989 : Vitória FC (Riboque)
1990 : GD Os Operários
1991 : Santana FC
1992 : no championship
1993 : GD Os Operários
1994 : Sporting Praia Cruz
1995 : Inter FC (Bom Bom)
1996 : Caixão Grande
1997 : no championship
1998 : GD Os Operários
1999 : Sporting Praia Cruz
2000 : Inter FC (Bom Bom)
2001 : Bairros Unidos FC (Caixão Grande)
2002 : no championship
2003 : Inter FC (Bom Bom)
2004 : GD Os Operários
2005 : no championship
2006 : no championship
2007 : Sporting Praia Cruz
2008 : no championship
2009–10 : GD Sundy
2011 : Sporting Clube do Príncipe
2012 : Sporting Clube do Príncipe
2013 : Sporting Praia Cruz
2014 : UDRA
2015 : Sporting Praia Cruz
2016 : Sporting Praia Cruz
2017 : UDRA
2018 : UDRA
2019 : Agrosport
2020 : Not held
2021–22 : GD Os Operários

Performance by club

1also known as Caixão Grande

Performance By Island

References

External links
 RSSSF
 

1
Top level football leagues in Africa
1977 establishments in São Tomé and Príncipe